Luís Gregorio López (born 14 March 1979) is a Venezuelan judoka. He competed in the men's half-heavyweight event at the 2000 Summer Olympics.

References

1979 births
Living people
Venezuelan male judoka
Olympic judoka of Venezuela
Judoka at the 2000 Summer Olympics
Place of birth missing (living people)